Purpuricenopsis humeralis is a species of beetle in the family Cerambycidae, the only species in the genus Purpuricenopsis.

References

Heteropsini